The 2013–14 UC Santa Barbara Gauchos men's basketball team represented the University of California, Santa Barbara during the 2013–14 NCAA Division I men's basketball season. The Gauchos, led by 16th year head coach Bob Williams, played their home games at the UC Santa Barbara Events Center, nicknamed The Thunderdome, as members of the Big West Conference. They finished the season 21–9, 12–4 in Big West play to finish in second place. They lost in the quarterfinals of the Big West Conference tournament to Cal Poly. Despite having 21 wins, they did not participate in a post season tournament.

Season

Preseason
The UC Santa Barbara schedule was announced in August 2013. Key games included road matches at UNLV, Colorado, and UCLA, as well as a trip to the Utah State Tournament, hosted by Utah State University. UCSB also scheduled to play host to teams such as South Dakota State, Utah State, and California. The Gauchos' conference slate included one home game and one away game against each of the eight other members of the Big West Conference.

Roster

Schedule and results

|-
!colspan=9 style="background:#1D1160; color:#FBCB55;"| Exhibition

|-
!colspan=9 style="background:#1D1160; color:#FBCB55;"| Non-conference games

|-
!colspan=9 style="background:#1D1160; color:#FBCB55;"| Conference games

|-
!colspan=9 style="background:#1D1160; color:#FBCB55;"| Big West tournament

References

UC Santa Barbara Gauchos men's basketball seasons
UC Santa Barbara
UC Santa Barbara Gauchos men's basketball team
UC Santa Barbara Gauchos men's basketball team